Dilobeia tenuinervis is a species of tree in the family Proteaceae. It is endemic to Madagascar.

Range and habitat
Dilobeia tenuinervis is a large tree, native to the humid lowland forests of southeastern Madagascar. It is known only from the Tsitongambarika forest in Anosy region, where it grows between 200 and 300 meters elevation.

The tree is threatened with habitat loss from illegal logging, conversion of forest to agriculture and pasture, and human-caused fires. It is assessed as Endangered.

References

External links

Proteaceae
Endemic flora of Madagascar
Flora of the Madagascar lowland forests